"Hardlight" is a song by Australian indie rock band Spacey Jane, released independently on 18 May 2022 as the fifth single from their second studio album, Here Comes Everybody. Premiered with Jack Saunders on BBC Radio 1, it peaked at number 37 on the NZ Hot Singles chart, and was considered by some outlets as a favourite to top the Triple J Hottest 100 of 2022 countdown, on which it was voted into third place. Following its appearance on the Triple J Hottest 100, it entered the ARIA Singles Chart at number 68. In August 2022, the band released a re-recorded version as part of Spotify Singles.

Background and release 
On 10 February 2022, the band announced on Triple J's breakfast program Bryce & Ebony that their forthcoming studio album would be titled Here Comes Everybody. On the same day as the announcement, they issued its third single, "Sitting Up". On 8 April, "It's Been a Long Day" was released as the fourth, and "Hardlight" followed on 19 May 2022. The song premiered on BBC Radio 1 with Jack Saunders, and the band shared details of a forthcoming Australian tour on the same day. A music video was also released, directed by Nick Mckk, which sees the band performing on a boat sailing through the Yarra River.

Composition 
Upon the release, frontman Caleb Harper claimed “I wrote this song about how I was feeling like my life was a bit like one of those nightmares where you’re at school with no pants, except I used the metaphor of being on set and forgetting all of your lines".

Reception 
Caleb Triscari of NME wrote "Hardlight" is a "standout from the album", comparing its sound to that of the War on Drugs and containing "reverb and layered guitar to illustrate the lingering, meaningless ache of depression". Deb Pelser of Backseat Mafia wrote the track features "the band's trademark jangly indie rock with an irresistible chorus and Harper’s plaintive vocals perfectly rounding out the track".

As of January 2023, the song has over four million streams on Spotify. Alex Callan of music publication Forte claimed "the Fremantle based garage rockers are in pretty good stead to take out the revered title" of topping Triple J's Hottest 100 of 2022.

Other versions 
On 17 August 2022, the band surprise released their second double A-side, Spotify Singles, containing a cover of Paramore's "The Only Exception" and an acoustic re-recording of "Hardlight". Upon its issuing, Harper stated "it was cool to go back to the song and play around with ideas that didn’t quite make the album cut and approach it with fresh ears". While touring at Melbourne venue Forum Theatre, the band further recorded a suite of additional acoustic performances of songs from Here Comes Everybody, including a rendition of "Hardlight" released in November 2022.

Personnel 

 Caleb Harper – vocals, guitar, writing
 Ashton Hardman-Le Cornu – lead guitar, writing
 Kieran Lama – drums, writing
 Peppa Lane – bass guitar, backing vocals, writing
 Konstantin Kersting – producer
 Rich Costey – mixing

Charts

References 

2022 singles
Songs written by Caleb Harper
Spacey Jane songs